Jung, brutal, gutaussehend 2 ("Young, violent, handsome 2") is the second collaborative studio album by German rappers Kollegah and Farid Bang, released on 8 February 2013 via Selfmade Records.

Background
In June 2009, Kollegah and Farid Bang released Jung, brutal, gutaussehend, their first collaborative studio album. It peaked on number 30 of the German album charts. Despite the negative reviews by critics, the album became a favourite between their fans. As a result, the rappers were asked about a second part repeatedly. Kollegah confirmed in an Interview in 2011, that they are planning to record a second album together. In October 2012, they confirmed Jung, brutal, gutaussehend 2.

Track listing

Charts

Weekly charts

Year-end charts

References

Kollegah albums
Farid Bang albums
2013 albums
Sequel albums
Collaborative albums